Mícheál Breathnach (1881 – 27 October 1908) was an Irish writer.

Breathnach was born at Cois Fharraige, County Galway, and worked for some time as a Secretary of the London Branch of the Gaelic League. He later worked as headmaster of the Connaught College in Toormakeady, County Mayo. He spent time in Switzerland for the sake of improving his health, his accounts of the country been published in An Claidheamh Soluis, and later published as Seilig i measg na nAlp. He translated Charles Kickham's novel, Knocknagow into Irish.

His name is commemorated in the name of Inverin based G.A.A. club, Míchael Breathnach CLG.

Bibliography
 Stair na hÉireann, Dublin, Conradh na Gaeilge, 1910–11
 Sliocht de sgribhinuibh Mhicil Bhreathnaigh, maille le na Bheathaibh, Tomás Mac Dómhnaill do sgriobh, 1913
 Seilig i measg na nAlp Dublin, 1917
 Cnoch na nGabha Dublin, 1924

See also
 Breathnach

1881 births
1908 deaths
Heads of schools in Ireland
Irish language activists
Irish-language writers
Irish non-fiction writers
Irish male non-fiction writers
Irish translators
People from County Galway
20th-century translators
19th-century translators